Frederick Stuart (24 September 1751 – 17 May 1802) was a British East India Company employee and politician.

He was born on 24 September 1751, the third son of John Stuart, 3rd Earl of Bute, and his wife Mary Wortley Montagu. Lord Bute was to become Prime Minister of Great Britain (1762–63) under George III. Frederick's siblings included: John, a politician; James and Charles, soldiers and politicians; William, an Anglican bishop; and Louisa, a writer. He studied at Winchester College and Christ Church, Oxford, before running away briefly to Paris. Described as the "black sheep of the family", his father obtained a writership for him at the East India Company in 1769, which was unusual for a family with such as position in society. He worked in Bengal and befriended Warren Hastings, who gave him a mission to the Nawab of Arcot.

After returning from India in 1775, Stuart entered parliament, representing the family interest of Ayr Burghs following a by-election in 1776. No seat was found for him in 1780; indebted, he fled to Paris in 1782. His brother, John, 1st Marquess of Bute, provided refuge and returned him to parliament in 1796 to represent the family interest of Buteshire. There is no evidence of parliamentary activity and he died, unmarried, on 17 May 1802 in London.

References

1751 births
1802 deaths
People educated at Winchester College
Alumni of Christ Church, Oxford
British East India Company people
Members of the Parliament of Great Britain for Scottish constituencies
British MPs 1774–1780
British MPs 1796–1800
Members of the Parliament of the United Kingdom for Scottish constituencies
UK MPs 1801–1802
Frederick Stuart
Younger sons of earls
Younger sons of barons
Children of prime ministers of the United Kingdom